Anton Kaltenberger (born 23 February 1904, date of death unknown) is an Austrian bobsledder who competed in the late 1920s and early 1930s. He won a bronze medal in the two-man event at the 1931 FIBT World Championships in Oberhof.

Kaltenberger also finished 19th in the two-man event at the 1936 Winter Olympics in Garmisch-Partenkirchen.

References
1936 bobsleigh two-man results
Bobsleigh two-man world championship medalists since 1931

1904 births
Year of death missing
Austrian male bobsledders
Olympic bobsledders of Austria
Bobsledders at the 1936 Winter Olympics